Dicaelus sculptilis is a species of ground beetle in the family Carabidae. It is found in North America.

Subspecies
These three subspecies belong to the species Dicaelus sculptilis:
 Dicaelus sculptilis intricatus LeConte, 1873
 Dicaelus sculptilis sculptilis Say, 1823
 Dicaelus sculptilis upioides Ball, 1959

References

Further reading

 

Harpalinae
Articles created by Qbugbot
Beetles described in 1823